Nikolaos Stournaras (1806–1853) is one of Greece’s National Benefactors having used his wealth to donate large pieces of land to various Greek charities.

History
He was born in Metsovo in 1806. Stournaras was an Aromanian. He was the son of Michael Tositsas’ sister. After completing his schooling in Metsovo, he went to Livorno, Italy where he worked in the Tositsas family business. Then he was sent to Paris to study in the Superior School of Trade and Industry. After finishing his studies, he moved to Alexandria, Egypt where he worked as an assistant of his uncle Michael Tositsas and then as manager of the Tositsas Trading House.

His visits to the agricultural and industrial centers of Europe and his studies in European schools gave him the idea to use his vast wealth to subsidize common good projects that would contribute to the development of Greece. He purchased large parcels of land in Fthiotida and donated large amounts to educational and charity institutions in Alexandria and Athens and for the foundation of a school in Metsovo.

In 1853, he came to Greece to work on development projects but he suddenly died. His development plans included a railroad that would connect Athens to Piraeus and the establishment of a shipping company that would connect Piraeus with the Greek islands and coastal towns. In his will, he left large amounts for charity, for the schools of Metsovo and Alexandria and for the establishment of a Polytechnic school in Greece.

References

I. Chatzifotis, “Oi Metsovites stin Aleksandreia” [The Metsovites in Alexandria], Minutes of the 1st conference of Metsovite Studies, Athens 1993, pp. 87–96. 
A. Goudas, Vioi Paralliloi ton epi tis anagenniseos tis Ellados diaprepsanton andron, Ploutos h’ Emporion [Parallel lives of the men who excelled during the Renaissance, Wealth and Commerce], Vol. C’, ek tou typographeiou M. P. Peridou, Athens 1870, pp. 289–318. 
A. Politou, O Ellinismos kai I Neotera Aigyptos, Vol. A’, I istoria tou aigyptiotou ellinismou 1798-1927 [Greeks and modern Egypt, vol A, the history of Greeks of Egypt], publ. Grammata, Aleksandreia-Athens 1928-1930, pp. 172,219,239,240.
V. Skafidas, “Istoria tou Metsovou” [History of Metsovo], Epirotiki Estia 12/132 (1963), pp. 291–293.
G. Plataris-Tzimas, Kodikas Diathikon, Meizones kai elassones euergetes tou Metsovou [Log of Wills, Major and Minor Benefactors of Metsovo], Vol. A’, publ. of the Prefecture of Ioannina and the City of Metsovo, Metsovo/Athens 2004, pp. 174–178.

Greek philanthropists
1806 births
1853 deaths
19th-century philanthropists
Aromanians from the Ottoman Empire
Greek people of Aromanian descent
People from Metsovo